Marta Markiewicz (born 13 June 1989), better known as Sarsa or Sarsa Markiewicz, is a Polish singer, songwriter, and record producer. She first achieved mainstream attention due to her 2015 single "Naucz mnie" (Teach me), which occupied the number-one position on the Polish singles chart for six consecutive weeks, and was certified diamond by the Polish Society of the Phonographic Industry (ZPAV). Her debut studio album Zapomnij mi was released on 28 August 2015.

Life and career

Early career
Sarsa was born on 13 June 1988 as Marta Markiewicz in Słupsk. She attended the Pomeranian Academy in Słupsk, majoring in art education. Sarsa first broke into the music industry in 2011, while participating in the second season of Must Be the Music. Three years later, she took part in the Polish version of The X Factor.

In 2014, she participated in the fifth season of The Voice of Poland. She was originally a member of Team Edyta Górniak, but was later stolen by Team Tomson & Baron. In the quarterfinals, she withdrew from the competition due to health issues.

2015–2016: Breakthrough and Zapomnij mi

After being signed to Universal Music Polska, Sarsa released her debut single "Naucz mnie" (Teach me) on 30 April 2015. The official music video was released two weeks later. The song peaked at number-one on the Polish singles chart and stayed there for six weeks. From 17–18 July, she represented Poland at the Baltic Song Contest, performing "Naucz mnie" and "Indiana". She won the audience award.

On 14 August, she released her second single "Indiana". The song peaked at number-one on the Polish new hits chart and in the top twenty of the Polish singles chart. Two weeks later, her debut studio album Zapomnij mi (Forget me) was released. The album peaked at number-two on the Polish albums chart. She was nominated for Best Polish Act at the 2015 MTV Europe Music Awards, but lost to Margaret. "Zapomnij mi" was released as the album's third single on 7 December.

2016–present: Pióropusze

In 2016, Sarsa revealed that her second album will be released in 2017. She's working with producer Steve Manowski, rapper VNM and other producents on the album. The first single from new album, "Bronię się", was released on 10 March 2017. Sarsa will set new music video for her second official single "Volta" on 20 May.

Discography

Studio albums

Singles

Awards and nominations

References

1988 births
Living people
People from Słupsk
Polish pop singers
Polish lyricists
The X Factor contestants
The Voice (franchise) contestants
Polish record producers
21st-century Polish singers
21st-century Polish women singers
Women record producers